Point Betsie Light is located on the northeast shore of Lake Michigan — at the southern entrance to the Manitou Passage — north of Frankfort in Benzie County in Northern Michigan.  Construction began in 1854, but it was not completed until 1858, and began service in the shipping season of 1859.  The lighthouse cost $5,000 to build.  In 1875, a life saving station was built for $3,000.

History
The light was originally equipped with a Fourth Order Fresnel lens  with bullseye, which was upgraded to a Third order (with bullseye) in 1880. The Fresnel Lens was removed in 1996, and was stored for years  at Sleeping Bear Dunes National Lakeshore. It has since been returned to the original site and sits, non-operational, inside the lighthouse where visitors can see its glass combination of engineering and artistry at close proximity.

It is attached to the Lighthouse keepers house, which was upgraded to an attractive gambrel roof design.

This was one of the earliest Life Saving Stations, and was run under the auspices of the U.S. Life-Saving Service.  In 1910 the United States Lighthouse Board was reconstituted as the U.S. Lighthouse Service.  In 1939 these agencies were merged under the control of the U.S. Coast Guard.

Prior to being automated in 1983, the 'wickies' operated the light for 106 years. This was the last manned lighthouse on Lake Michigan and the last Michigan lighthouse to lose its keeper. The light is now a Vega VRB-25 system.

In addition to the lighthouse, the site presently includes a fog signal building and an oil house.  Most remnants of the former lifesaving station site have disappeared, including the original boathouse.  Some of the former housing units were converted through the years into private cottages and still sit amongst the dunes nearby. Most notable amongst these are the former horse barn which is incorporated into a seasonal cottage to the north of the site, and the sizable 1920s lifesaving personnel dormitory house to the south.  A newly constructed building housing a gift shop, public bathrooms and an area for display of related artifacts is slated to open in 2014.

Fog signals have received much attention at Point Betsie. In the autumn of 1912, the fog signal building was rebuilt.  The  locomotive whistles were replaced by 10 inch chime whistles.  Meanwhile, the lamp was upgraded to an incandescent oil vapor system, with an intensity of 55,000 candlepower.  In 1921, upon being connected to the electrical power grid, aa 110-volt electric bulb was installed, and the fog signal upgraded to twin Type "G" diaphones, driven by electric air compressors. The diaphone doubled the audible radius, and had the added benefit that it could be brought on line immediately, without waiting for steam engines to build pressure.  The following April the fog signal's characteristic was changed to a group of two blasts every 30 seconds.  Dismantled and sold as junk to the local residents in the 1970s, who hauled it away, all original fog horn apparatus has long since disappeared and is no longer on site.

The light is located on Point Betsie, Michigan, which in turn is part of a recognized terrestrial marine near shore ecosystem, dominated by a coastal dune with unique flora and fauna, including Pitcher's Thistle, Lake Huron Locust, and fascicled broomrape.

Current status
The station was transferred to Benzie County under the terms of the National Historic Lighthouse Preservation Act in 2004 and, with the extensive leadership and volunteer power provided by The "Friends of Point Betsie Lighthouse"  extensive restoration and renovation continues to this day.  For example, the lightstation has been repainted to its original color scheme, which has not been seen since the 1940s. The site is open for tours on a seasonal basis.

Point Betsie is said to be one of America's most photographed lighthouses, and the most-visited attraction in Benzie County.  Because of its picturesque form and location, it is often the subject of photographs and drawings.  Even needlepoint illustrations have been rendered.

It is listed on the National Register of Historic Places, Reference #84001375.

See also
Lighthouses in the United States

Gallery

References

Further reading
 Hawley, Jonathon P., Point Betsie: Lightkeeping and Lifesaving on Northeastern Lake Michigan 264 p., 61 B&W photos  (Ann Arbor, Michigan: University of Michigan Press 2008) .

External links 

 Friends of the Point Betsie Light - official site
 Clarke Historical Library, Central Michigan University, Bibliography for Benzie County
 Detroit News, Interactive map on Michigan lighthouses
 Interactive map of lighthouses in area of Lake Michigan
 Interactive map/list/information of lighthouses in northeastern Lake Michigan by LighthousesRus
 Map of Michigan Lighthouse 
 Michigan lighthouse fund, Point Betsie Light
 National Park Service Inventory of historic light stations, Point Betsie
 Photographs of Point Betsie Light
 Summary chronology of Point Betsie light
 

Lighthouses completed in 1854
Houses completed in 1854
Lighthouses on the National Register of Historic Places in Michigan
Michigan State Historic Sites
Life-Saving Service stations
National Register of Historic Places in Benzie County, Michigan
1859 establishments in Michigan